Two star, two stars and similar may refer to:

 A grading of a hotel, restaurant, film, etc. in a star (classification) scheme
 Two star petrol, a class of Leaded petrol formerly sold in the UK
 Two-star rank, a senior military rank
 Two-Handed Trans-Atlantic Race (TwoSTAR)

Astronomy
 Double star
 Binary star

Arts and entertainment
 Les deux étoiles Théophile Gautier 1848
 2 stars (song), performed by Meaghan Martin for the TV movie "Camp Rock"
 The Two Stars (ballet), first performed 1870 in Russia

See also

STAR-2, Orbital Sciences Corp satellite bus model
For other numbers of stars, see :Category:Star ranking systems